Shay Kun  (Hebrew: שי קון; born 1974) is an Israeli-American painter known for post-modern interpretation of the Hudson River School movement. He is the son of Israeli painter Zeev Kun.

Biography

Shay Kun was born in Tel Aviv, Israel, to Hungarian parents that survived the Holocaust, Ze'ev and Heddy Kun, both artists. Kun's first solo exhibition has been in Tel Aviv at age 18. He later studied at Bezalel Academy of Art and Design in Jerusalem (1998) and received his masters at Goldsmiths, University of London (2000). Since then, he has been living and working in New York City.

His works has been exhibited worldwide, including solo shows at Linda Warren projects in Chicago, Benrimon Contemporary in New York, Bill Lowe Gallery in Atlanta, Michael Schultz Gallery in Berlin, LaMontagne Gallery in Boston and at Hezi Cohen Gallery in Tel Aviv as well as numerous group shows, including at The 51st Venice Biennale, Shanghai Contemporary Art Museum, Untitled gallery in New York, Fortes Vilaca Gallery in São Paulo, Leslie Smith in Amsterdam, and at Lehmann Maupin Gallery, New York.

Kun infuses traditional Hudson River School images of nature, particularly Thomas Cole, Frederic Edwin Church and Albert Bierstadt. His painstaking attention to detail and composition of fantasy landscapes on canvas are updated with contemporary mass production Pop art motifs, out of scale and perspective. Kun's hyperreality and postmodernism style creates a jarring utopia. In that respect, he inherited The Holocaust influence on his parents' art. His mother paintings are utopian landscapes of an ideal world, while the paintings of his father, shows a dark world falling apart.

The New York Observer wrote: "Elements that he incorporates into his brilliantly colored, sometimes gaudy canvases including brittle, biscuit-tin landscapes of the sort mass-produced in factories in Taiwan...The show,'Exfoliations', is further proof, like Mark Ryden's recent show at Paul Kasmin, that the huge world of kitsch has become fair game for fine art".

Selected solo exhibitions 
2006 Melting Midlands, BUIA Gallery, New York 
2007 Old Flames Don't Die Out They Build New Fires, Tavi Dresdner Gallery, Tel Aviv
2007 Perversion Is The Love We Feel When Others Feel Love. SEVENTEEN Gallery, London 
2009 Opportunities multiply as they are seized. David Castillo Gallery, Miami  
2010 Exfoliations, Benrimon Contemporary, New York  
2010 Slack Tide, Lamontagne Gallery, Boston
2012 Domestic Sticky Wildlife, Martine Chaisson Gallery, New Orleans  
2012 Be First, Be Smarter or Cheat, Benrimon Contemporary, New York  
2013 An Extra, Hezi Cohen Gallery, Tel Aviv 
2013 Feast and Famine. Linda Warren Gallery, Chicago 
2014 Disambiguation. Bill Lowe Gallery, Atlanta  
2014 Uproar. Michael Schultz Gallery, Berlin
2015 Nature Does Not Know Extinction Only Transformation, JBD Gallery, New York

Selected group exhibitions 

2001 Hi Falutin’, Hi Kickin’. VTO Gallery, London
2001 Egotripping, Anthony. Wilkinson Gallery, London
2001 Cream, Rosenfeld Gallery, Tel Aviv
2002 PoT, Joint Exhibition, Liverpool Biennale, Liverpool
2002 Artists Respond, Joint Exhibition, Somerville Museum of Art, Massachusetts
2003 Puppy Love, Pelham Art Center, Westchester County, New York
2004 Primo, BUIA Gallery, New York
2004 Feast or Famine: Artists and Food. DNA Gallery, Provincetown, Massachusetts 
2004 Raid Projects. The Armory Show, New York
2005 Children of the Grave, The Agency Gallery, London
2005 Poles Apart / Poles Together, 51st Venice Biennale, Venice
2005 In the Ring, BUIA Gallery, New York
2006 Shifting Landscapes, Aftermodern Gallery, San Francisco
2006 Breezer, BUIA Gallery, New York
2007 …A Landscape Show, Samson Projects, Boston  
2007 Subreality, Aftermodern Gallery, San Francisco
2008 In Your Face, BUIA Gallery, New York
2008 Pole Shift, Project Gentili, Berlin
2008 Somewhere To Elsewhere, Linda Warren Gallery, Chicago
2008 Artfutures, Bloomberg Space, London 
2009 Animamix, The Shanghai Contemporary Art Museum, Shanghai 
2009 Golden Record: Sounds of Earth, The Collection, Lincoln, England 
2009 Three Painters, BUIA Gallery, New York
2010 The Law of the Jungle, Lehmann Maupin Gallery, New York
2010 Interrupted Landscape, Champion Contemporary, Austin, Texas  
2010 Generations, DNA Gallery, Provincetown, Massachusetts
2010 Fresh Apples, Hezi Cohen Gallery, Tel Aviv 
2010 The Artist's Guide to the L.A. Galaxy, West Los Angeles  College Art Gallery, Los Angeles
2011 Update your Reality, Alexander Ochs Galleries, Berlin
2012 Figuration Y?,Galerie Favardin & De Verneuil, Paris
2012 Good Intentions, Hezi Cohen Gallery, Tel Aviv
2013 Rothfeld Collection, American University Museum, Washington, D.C.
2013 PAN Amsterdam, Leslie Smith Gallery, Amsterdam
2013 I Love Shanghai, Art Labor Gallery, Shanghai 
2013 Jew York, Untitled Gallery, New York  
2013 100 Little Deaths, BravinLee programs, New York  
2014 Contemporary Painting, University of Saint Francis, Fort Wayne, Indiana  
2014 Cirrus, Dorfman Projects, New York 
2014 Black and White, Lamontagne Gallery, Boston

References

External links 
 Shay kun: press 
 At Linda Warren projects website 
 At Hezi Cohen Gallery website

Jewish American artists
Postmodern artists
Living people
Bezalel Academy of Arts and Design alumni
Alumni of Goldsmiths, University of London
Israeli painters
Jewish painters
Year of birth missing (living people)
21st-century American Jews